The Democratic Republic of the Congo men's national volleyball team represents Democratic Republic of the Congo in international volleyball competitions and friendly matches.

Results

African Men's Volleyball Championship
1993 — 6th place
2003 — 6th place
2005 — 7th place
2021 - 8th place

All-Africa Games
2007 — 9th place

External links
FIVB profile

Volleyball
National men's volleyball teams
Men's sport in the Democratic Republic of the Congo
Volleyball in the Democratic Republic of the Congo